Varner is an unincorporated community in Kingman County, Kansas, United States.

History
A post office was opened in Varner in 1895, and remained in operation until it was discontinued in 1972.

Education
The community is served by Kingman–Norwich USD 331 public school district.

References

Further reading

External links
 Kingman County maps: Current, Historic, KDOT

Unincorporated communities in Kingman County, Kansas
Unincorporated communities in Kansas